Jaap "Jim" Enters (born 8 November 1939) is a retired Dutch rower. He competed at the 1964 Summer Olympics in the coxless fours, together with Herman Boelen, Sipke Castelein and Sjoerd Wartena, and finished in fourth place. He won a European bronze in the coxless pairs with Boelen in 1963.

References

1939 births
Living people
Dutch male rowers
Olympic rowers of the Netherlands
Rowers at the 1964 Summer Olympics
People from Palembang
European Rowing Championships medalists
20th-century Dutch people
21st-century Dutch people